The Cadotte River is a tributary of the Peace River in Northern Alberta, Canada.

The river gives the name to the Cadotte Member, a stratigraphical unit of the Western Canadian Sedimentary Basin.

Course
It flows north forming a series of small lakes along its course, then empties into the Cadotte Lake, which also receives the waters of Marten River from the east. The river flows westwards and is crossed by Highway 989/688 before it receives the waters of Otter River from the Buffalo Head Hills. It continues west, then turns north and flows parallel to the Peace River, also receiving the Little Cadotte River from the west.

Tributaries
Cadotte Lake
Marten River
Otter River
Golden Lake
Otter Lakes
Simon Lakes
Little Cadotte River
Jackpine Creek

See also
List of rivers of Alberta

References

Rivers of Alberta